Malagos Agri-Ventures Corporation (d.b.a. Malagos Chocolate) is a Philippine bean-to-bar chocolate manufacturer based in Davao City.

History
The firm's history dates back to 2003, when company founders, Roberto and Charita Puentespina leased farm land with cacao trees in Malagos in the Baguio District of Davao City. Charita Puentespina then rehabilitated the farm which enabled the harvesting of cacao pods from the trees. She used the harvested cacao beans to make tablea by roasting them in firewood then grinding and molding them. The resulting chocolate was found to have a silky flavor.

In December 2007, the cocoa sustainability team of Mars, Incorporated connected with the Puentespinas to establish the Mars Cocoa Development Center where the farm of the Puentespinas learned agricultural practices related to cacao.

This venture led to the establishment of the Malagos Agri-Ventures Corporation in October 2012 and the firm began producing single-origin cocoa liquor. Malagos Chocolate was commercially launched in June 2013 and began producing other chocolate products.

Products and services

Malagos cultivates their own cacao at their Bureau of Plant Industry-certified farm at the foothills of Mount Talomo. They are also responsible for the fermentation, drying, sorting, roasting of the cacao beans they use in their production of chocolate.

Malagos uses Grade A cacao beans of the Trinitario variety which comes from a hybrid of Forastero and Criollo.

The firm also buys beans from around 100 small-scale cocoa farmers in the Davao area and supplies cacao seeds, seedlings and scions throughout Mindanao. In October 2017, It was reported that Malagos Chocolate along with other chocolate brands would be participating in “Salon du Chocolat” on October 28 to November 1 in Paris, France.

Reception
Malagos has received international recognition, including seven major international awards for its chocolate products. 

In 2015, the company received a silver award for its Malagos Dark Chocolate at the International Chocolate Awards in Hannover, Germany. The company has also received recognitions for its unsweetened chocolate. In April 2015 it was awarded for the Best Unflavoured Drinking Chocolate (bronze), and another recognition in the following year (silver). Malagos garnered a bronze award each for its 62 percent dark chocolates and 72 percent dark chocolates bars in the 2017 edition of the awards.

References

External links

 

Food and drink companies established in 2012
Confectionery companies of the Philippines
2012 establishments in the Philippines
Companies based in Davao City
Food and drink companies of the Philippines
Drink companies of the Philippines
Philippine brands
Dairy products companies of the Philippines
Philippine chocolate companies